Dedan has several different meanings in the Hebrew Bible. Dedan (now part of Al-'Ula, Saudi Arabia) was an oasis and city-state of north-western Arabia. The people of Dedan are called Dedanim or Dedanites. Dedan is also the name of the son of Raamah and the son of Jokshan.

The word Dedan ( Dəḏān;  Dudan, Dadan, Daedan in Brenton's Septuagint Translation)  means "low ground".

Men named Dedan
In the Hebrew Bible, the name Dedan is assigned to two different men:
 A son of Raamah (Genesis 10:7). His descendants are mentioned in Isaiah 21:13, Ezekiel 25:13 and Ezekiel 27:15. They probably settled among the sons of Cush, on the north-west coast of the present Persian Gulf.
 A son of Jokshan, son of Abraham and his concubine Keturah (Genesis 25:3, 1 Chronicles 1:32). His descendants settled on the Syrian borders about the territory of Edom. They probably led a pastoral life.

The name Dedan comes possibly from the Hebrew noun (dd), meaning breast or nipple, or the Hebrew verb (dada), meaning move slowly, lead slowly (Psalm 42:5, Isaiah 38:15). It may be connected with (dwd) the root for beloved (aunt, uncle, even the name David).

History 
Dedan is mentioned in the Book of Ezekiel, (Chapters 27 and 38). Chapter 27 is a roster of the trading partners of the city of Tyre (today in modern Lebanon), where Dedan is noted as a nation or kingdom which traded in saddle blankets (Ezekiel 27:20).

The oasis kingdom is also mentioned in the prophetic vision of the war of Gog and Magog (Ezekiel 38; see also, Revelation 20:8), and appears to be a nation of significance in this end-times prophecy of Ezekiel.

Isaiah 21:13 and Ezekiel 27:15 identify the Dedanim or Dedanites as a trading people.

In Ezekiel 38:13, Dedan is joined with Sheba and "Tarshish and all her strong lions": all these nations joining together to inquire of the advancing armies of Gog: "Have you come to plunder? Have you gathered your hordes to loot, to carry off silver and gold, to take away livestock and goods and to seize much plunder?"

Now known as Al-'Ula in northern Saudi Arabia, known to the ancient Greeks and Romans as Hijra, Hegra or Egra, the former is about the same distance, about 250 miles north from Medina as Medina is north of Mecca. The location where the extinct tribe of Thamud used to dwell.

In the ruins of the old city there are inscriptions that indicate the Dedanites were preceded by a Minean settlement. The Mineans established a center at this desert oasis in order to protect the incense trade.

See also 
 Lihyan

References

External links 

 Dedan "The Incense Road: Dedan"
 "The (Re-) Discovery of Mada'in Salih, Ancient Hegra, Saudi Arabia"
 "Al-'Ula (Saudi Arabia): A Report on a Historical and Archaeological Survey"

Arab groups
History of Saudi Arabia
Book of Genesis people

ca:Llista de personatges bíblics#Dedan